Yoram Gal (born January 7, 1952) is an international Israeli painter, playwright, director, actor and theater, TV and cinema producer. His first play was EVERYMAN (1978). He has been an actor and director and a painter in the United States, China and more, with collectors of his works in Canada, Australia, Europe and Israel.

Biography
Yoram Gal was born in Jerusalem, son of Ephraim Roytenberg - Fima - a Jewish painter born in Harbin, China, and emigrated to Israel in 1949, and Naomi Margalit, born in Jerusalem, a teacher and economist. His parents divorced when Gal was a year old. When he was six, his mother married Yossef Gal, an economist, and the three moved to the center of Jerusalem. Three years later, his sister Aya, psychologist, was born, and when he was 11 the family moved to London, UK, where Yossef Gal represented the state of Israel as the economic attache's in the embassy. Gal began painting at age 12 when he underwent psychotherapy at the Anna Freud Clinic in London. In painting, he found catharsis for his soul's storms, and at age 15 he passed the A' Level exams in Art, which enabled him to enter Art College. His teacher Mr. Rhymer advised against it, and told him simply to paint and observe and self study works of masters like Van Gogh and Botticelli. He excelled in Maths and Physics and graduated from JFS - the Jewish high school, at age 17, returned to Israel and joined the IDF Nahal unit, ending his three-year service as a lieutenant. In Jerusalem, he worked in a photo store and exhibited his first one-man show in Beit Mori. The leading Israeli newspaper Yediot Ahronot published a favorable critique of the show, written by the renowned critic Miriam Tal.

In 1973 he served in the Sinai in the 1973 War, and then he studied Theater and Cinema at Tel Aviv University, graduated with Honors BFA majoring in Theater, began writing a Ph.D. on Jean Genet, and stopped, deciding to be an artist net. During his student years he published short stories in newspapers. Upon graduating from Tel Aviv University he began to write plays. His first play "Everyman" was performed at the Tel Aviv University Theater, directed by Prof. Edna Shavit, whom he married in 1978 and moved to live in Old Jaffa. In the following years Gal wrote dozens of stage plays, screenplays, short stories and novels. Among them about 15 plays for children and youth which were performed by his "Traveling Theater". His plays were produced in fringe theaters like Tzavta, Hasimta, Acco Festival of Alternative Israeli Theatre, and Haifa’s International Festival of children’s plays. During years Gal act sporadically in TV and cinema films, Israeli, American and British, directed some of his plays, designed sceneries for stage, painted and sold his paintings in one man shows.

Because he delved in diverse and many art forms simultaneously he was quite often nicknamed "The Renaissance Artist". and infuriated theater critics when he acted, directed, produced and wrote plays, garnering mocking critics like: "What does he think himself to be, Shakespeare?" Following one critic’s naming him "Pretentious" he wrote the play "The Rooster" (Originally "The Pretentious Rooster") 1988. For his theater acting he received many praises, as well as for his visual arts talents as painter and designer. From 1986 to 1994 most of his plays for children - some of which were co-written with Prof. Arie Sover - achieved high commercial success.

In 1996 he married Nili Dotan, playwright and screenwriter, and in 2000 their son Nimrod was born. In 1999 Nili produced the film "Wild" which Gal wrote and directed. "Wild" received enthusiastic critiques in the Israeli newspaper, was invited to ten international film festivals and received "Best Feature Film" award in the alternative independent film festival in Picciano, Italy, 2001. In 2013 they divorced. Gal married a third time in 2017 to Tzlila Hurvitz, who set up his studio in Old Jaffa as an open gallery to the public. They divorced in 2020. The open studio is flourishing and shipping original paintings world wide.

Gal and Dotan got into debt, even though the film was distributed by the big "Golan-Globus Films" Theatres chain. Only at the end of 2002, when his paintings landed in the US, the turn around occurred. The journey of coming free of debt while moving from theater and cinema to painting only, and the falling in love with America which brought him money, glory and satisfaction, he recorded in a semi autobiographical, illustrated novel which he published on Amazon.com as an E Book in 2009: "The Secret of America". Since 2002 Gal focuses on painting. He has a multitude of collectors and over a thousand buyers, mainly in the United States but also in Canada, Australia, Europe, China and Israel, he received dozens of awards, and began to show in China too. Gal lives in Old Jaffa, traveling abroad several times a year.

Exhibitions, Museums and Awards
Since 2003 Gal has participated in dozens of Art Shows across the US, in what’s called "Art Festivals". Among the more prominent ones: Sausalito, CA, Belleville, IL, La Quinta, CA, Cottonwood - Richardson, TX, Bruce Museum - Greenwich, CT, Armonk, NY, Port Clinton - Chicago, IL, Woodlands, TX, Bayou City - Houston, TX, Boardwalk - Virginia Beach, VA, Brookside - Kansas City, MO, Bethesda Row, MD, Park City, UT, and many more.
Outside of the USA he was invited to the Florence Biennale 2005, Beijing Art Expo 2011 and more...
Gal was awarded about 40 times in the years 2004–2015 in American Art Shows. Best in Show and Best in Painting Awards and some Merit awards too. The Fu DzeNan Museum in Nanjing, China, run by and established by the famous Chinese painter Fu DzeNan acquired 12 major pieces from Gal in 2011. He has had 15 one man shows of his work since the first 1973 one in Jerusalem.

Filmography

Theater
 Everyman, director Edna Shavit, 1978.
 ''Hanoch and Sophocles, director Yoram Gal, 1980.
 Billy-Bull The Great, director Edna Shavit, 1983.
 Outs, director Yoram Gal, 1984
 Isaac the Crybaby and his revenge on the Homeland, director Aviel Hadari,1985
 The Careerist, director Dorit Yerushalmi, 1987
 Bergman, Michael Almaz’s Theater in London, director Yigal Azrati, 1988, in English.
 The Rooster, director Edna Shavit, 1989.
 Jacobo Hero of Goldonia, director Edna Shavit, 1989.

Gal has written many plays which have not yet been produced, among them Psyche (1983), Spiritolini (1989), Professor Bergman (1982), Gabriella (1993), Hanita sets out on Life (1994), El Rais Is Coming (1994), The Egotist (1994), The Individualist and The Devil (1993), The Buick and The Caravan (1992) and Shira from T (1990).

Theater acting
 The Family (1976)
 Everyman (1978)
 Billy-Bull The Great (1983)
 Outs (1984)
 Yehezkel Fireman's Tales (1986)
 Eliezer Ben-Yehuda (1982)
 Herzl - King of the Jews (1987)
 The Miser (1994–2003)
 The Rooster (1990)
 A gentle Spirit (1993)

Plays for children and youth
 Yaki Anaki, director Agnes Poldash, 1980.
 The Old Man Walks, director Edna Shavit, 1986.
 King of The Jews, director Edna Shavit, 1988.
 Where did the Laughter go, co-directed by Gal/Sover, 1988.
 Anatoly’s Hope, co directed by Gal/Sover, 1990.
 Drugs Lie, director Arieh Sover, 1990.
 David’s Violin, co-directed by Gal/Sover, 1992.
 Maranos, Shema Israel, director Yaki Mecherez, 1992.
 Rutty Heroine of Jerusalem, director Yoram Gal, 1993.
 Deddy and Lisa Salamat, director Yoram Gal, 1994.
 Let There Be Light, director Yoram Gal, 1995.
 Safely, director Yoram Gal, 1995.
 Don Quixote, director Ednan Tarabshe, 1994.
 The Old Man and I''', 2001.
 Yotam The Wild One, director Yoram Gal, 2003.

Visual design (stage)
 Rubber Merchants by Hanoch Levin (1978)

Cinema and TV
Wrote and directed the feature film "WILD", which was independently produced and upon completion received backing by Israeli FilmFunds, was invited to Film Festivals worldwide, got first prize for feature film in the Indie Film Fest "The Alternative Film Festival" in Picciano Italy 2001, was purchased by SBS (Australian TV channel) and YES in Israel and more.
Created and produced (in co-operation with Opus, Gil Mitterani) the Israeli video cassette for toddlers "Wheels", director Nili Dotan. Distribution Hed Artzi 2001. partial filmography at the New York Times website.

Directing
 Hanoch and Sophocles (1980)
 Outs (1984)
 The House is going to be empty again (1996)
 The Old Man and I (2001)
 The Game (2001)

TV and film acting
 Under a black cloud's shadow (1980)
 Remembrance of Love (1982)
 A Dinner of Herbs (1988)
 Friends of Yael (1990)
 Kamikaza (1977)
 Black day in Sde Avraham (1984)
 Shmita Year (1986)
 The mirrors Scale (1991)
 The Revolutionary - Life of Jesus (1995–96)
 The Tale of the man who was silent (1998)
 Yes or No (2000)

External links
 Interviews on American TV Channels

Notes and references

Israeli male stage actors
Israeli theatre directors
Israeli painters
Living people
1952 births